Saint-Lambert is a parish municipality in northwestern Quebec, Canada, in the Abitibi-Ouest Regional County Municipality. It had a population of 194 in the Canada 2016 Census. The municipality was incorporated on May 14, 1938.

Demographics 

Language

Municipal council
Mayor
 Emilien Rivard
 Councillors 
Daniel Garant
Ronald Marion
Michel Morin
Diane Provost
Yves Thériault
Yvon Thibeault

See also
 List of parish municipalities in Quebec

References

Parish municipalities in Quebec
Incorporated places in Abitibi-Témiscamingue